Ilias Ignatidis (born 11 November 1996) is a Greek professional footballer who plays as a forward for Poseidon Neas Michanionas.

Career
Ignatidis joined the Bulgarian club Levski Karlovo in October. He scored a brace on his debut for the team in a 2–1 home win against Ludogorets Razgrad II.

Ignatidis played for Poseidon Nea Michanionas from the summer 2017 until January 2018, before joining Aris Paleochoriou. However, he returned to the club on 30 July 2019.

Career statistics

Club

References

External links

1996 births
Living people
Greek footballers
Association football forwards
Vasas SC players
FC Levski Karlovo players
Greek expatriate footballers
Expatriate footballers in Hungary
Expatriate footballers in Bulgaria
Greek expatriate sportspeople in Hungary
Greek expatriate sportspeople in Bulgaria
Nemzeti Bajnokság I players
Footballers from Thessaloniki